This is a list of football players who represented the Palestine national football team in  international football and were born outside the State of Palestine.

The following players:
have played at least one game for the full (senior male) Palestine international team; and
were born outside Palestine.

This list includes players who have dual citizenship with Palestine and/or have become naturalized Palestinian citizens. The players are ordered per modern-day country of birth; if the country at the time of birth differs from the current, this is indicated with a subsection.

Players

Argentina 
 Pablo Abdala
 Daniel Mustafá
 Alejandro Naif
 Carlos Salom

Chile 
 Edgardo Abdala
 Francisco Atura
 Patricio Acevedo
 Jonathan Cantillana
 Yashir Islame
 Matías Jadue
 Roberto Kettlun
 Hernán Madrid
 Alexis Norambuena
 Bruno Pesce
 Pablo Tamburrini
 Leonardo Zamora
 Nicolás Zedán

Egypt 
 Ramzi Saleh
 Mohammed Samara

Israel 
 Atef Abu Bilal
 Ala'a Abu Saleh
 Hussam Abu Saleh
 Saleh Chihadeh
 Mohammed Darweesh
 Haytham Dheeb
 Ali El-Khatib
 Rami Hamadeh
 Ahmed Harbi
 Abdallah Jaber
 Shadi Shaban
 Mahmoud Yousef
 Fadi Zidan

Kuwait 
 Majed Abu-Sidu
 Mohammed Al-Masri
 Omar Jarun

Lebanon 
 Wasim Abdalhadi

Paraguay 
 Javier Cohene

Slovenia 
 Jaka Ihbeisheh

Sweden 
 Mahmoud Eid
 Michel Termanini
 Imad Zatara

Syria 
 Omar Khalil

United States
 Nazmi Albadawi

List of countries

See also
 List of Palestine international footballers
 List of Palestine women's international footballers

References

 
Palestine
Association football player non-biographical articles
Palestine
Palestinian diaspora
Palestine